This is a list of historical wars or other military conflicts outside the geographic boundaries of Japan in which Japanese soldiers participated.  It is not comprehensive.

Ancient history and Middle Ages

By some interpretations, predominantly those of Japanese scholars, an ancient stone monument (the Gwanggaeto Stele) erected in honor of the Goguryeo King Gwanggaeto in 414, records that in 391, the Yamato kingdom sent an invasion force against an alliance between the ancient Korean kingdoms of Baekje and Silla and defeated both armies. Later Baekje became a Japanese ally in further fighting on the Korean peninsula.
During the Yamato Empire period in the 6th century the Yamato state participated in the armed struggles between the three Korean peninsular kingdoms of Goguryeo, Baekje and Silla. The 7th-century Japanese history Nihon Shoki claims Japan acquired the territory of Mimana, or Karak, with its capital at Nihonpu). This claim is disputed by Korean historians due to a lack of evidence in non-Japanese histories. In any case, Yamato Japan did foster close relations with the Baekje state but in 562 they were effectively expelled from peninsular affairs by an increasingly powerful Silla state. Again, Japanese sources claim that at various times Yamato Japan attempted to recover its erstwhile Korean possessions but were repeatedly defeated by the Koreans, namely Silla. In 663 Silla, allied with Tang China and destroyed the Japanese naval fleet along the Korean coast. Silla's final defeat of Baekje and Goguryeo and its unification of the peninsula ended Japanese territorial ambitions, such as they were, on the peninsula for nearly a millennium.
The Japanese ruler Toyotomi Hideyoshi launched an attempt to conquer Ming China in 1591 with an invasion of Korea, but was defeated, in large part as a result of naval defeats at the hands of the Korean admiral Yi Sunshin. The Japanese invaded again in 1597–1598. 
Also during Hideyoshi's reign, in 1574, a Chinese pirate and navigator, Si-Ma Hong, arrived at Mariveles in the Philippines. His second chief Shioko, disembarked at Parañaque with 600 seamen, who were Japanese. His intent was to take Manila, but he was defeated by the Spanish.
Years later another Japanese navigator and buccaneer with the name Tayfusan or Taizufu captured Cagayan.

19th century

In the early 19th century, samurai expeditions to the Asian mainland skirmished with Russian, Chinese, and Mongol forces.
The Chinese-Japanese War occurred in 1894–1895.
The Boxer Rebellion

20th century

The Russian-Japanese War occurred in 1904–1905.
The first attempted Japanese invasion of Russian territory was led by Gungi, a soldier and local settler of Shumushu. He led a minor invasion group from Shumushu, which disembarked on the Cape Lopatka area in Kamchatka.
During the same war, a Japanese fleet bombarded Vladivostok's fortifications and immediately retired from the area. This was part of a plan to capture them, but the plan was suspended.
Japan acquired the Liaotung Peninsula, South Manchurian Railway Zone, and Karafuto island in 1905.
Japan annexed Korea in 1905–1910.
Japanese actions during the First World War:
Japanese ships bombarded and landed troops in German controlled territory in the Kirchow (Kiaochow) German, and landed some troops in the German Pacific islands territories, in Micronesia.
In the same period, Japanese forces took the Rabaul bases in the Admiralty Islands in the New Guinea area and defeated the German naval force of Admiral Von Spee, who ordered a withdrawal to the East Pacific area.
At the same time, Japanese landed from Formosa and took for a while the Chinese province of Fujian, also promoting some revolts against the Chinese central government.
Following ancient claims to the Hawaii islands and its area, the Imperial Japanese Navy sent the Warship "Asama Maru" and other vessels to U.S. and Mexican Pacific coasts on secret missions before and during WWI. The "Asama" patrolled in the Gulf of California (Cortes Sea) in April 1915. According to some reports of Native American watchers in Arizona and an American Army secret expedition to the Mexican Sonora Desert, some Naval infantry landed from these Japanese vessels and patrolled in the Sonora and Arizona before returning to their vessels. There were some rumors of Imperial Japanese Army or Navy officers acting as advisers to the Mexican armies of Adolfo de la Huerta, Venustiano Carranza or Pancho Villa at this time. Japan had interest in the U.S. Pacific Coasts, Mexico, Latin America and the recently constructed Panama Canal.
The Japanese were awarded the South Seas Mandate in 1919 for the German colonies in the Pacific Ocean that they had taken during World War I. They were also granted the territories in Shantung that they had taken. The Japanese claimed the New Guinea area, arguing that certain Japanese navigators had arrived in the area in ancient times.
The Japanese intervened in 1918–1925 in Siberia.
The Japanese landed at Petropavlovsk-Kamchatsky and captured of Kamchatka. Japan retained this area until 1927.
Japan gained partial control of the northern sector of Sakhalin island from 1918 until 1925.
According to some sources, Japanese intervention forces in the Russian Far East employed expeditionary groups to Central Asia and Central Western Siberia.
The establishment of the first intended puppet state in Siberia, called Republic of Far East, took place in 1918–1922. Japan administered this territory through local Russian leaders, the Cossack Ataman Semeonoff and his aide Lieutenant Kalmykoff. This was during the times of the White Russian anti-communist administration of Admiral Kolchak. These Russian leaders were under the effective control of the Japanese Army's General Ohi. 
The Japanese virtually controlled the Okhotsk sea area, U.S. territory and fisheries until 1925–1927. In an agreement reached with the Soviets, Japan received some fishing rights in the area and mineral rights in North Sakhalin.
The Soviet-Japanese East Railway Incident occurred in 1929
The Soviet revenge action in Manzhouli took place later in the same year
The Mukden Incident occurred in 1931.
The second historical Japanese foundation of a puppet state took place in Manchuria in 1932, under the name of Manchukuo, with Puyi as Head of State under the control of the Kwantung Army, representing the Imperial Japanese Army
The Japanese occupied Jehol Province in 1933, and annexed this territory to Manchukuo.
The Mongol pro-Japanese state of Mengjiang, with Denchungdongrb as its leader, was formed under Japanese Army guidance, along with other Chinese pro-Japanese governments in Hopei province
The Second Sino-Japanese War took place in 1937–1945.
On December 12, 1937, the "Panay incident" occurred. This attack involved several Japanese Navy dive-bombers striking and sinking the American patrol boat "Panay" in the Yangtze River. U.S.-Japanese hostilities almost began in the same year.
The Changkufeng Incident took place in 1938.
The Nomonhan Incident occurred in 1939.
Another client nation, the Wang Jingwei Government, was created in occupied central China in 1940, with Wang Chingwei as head of state, Japanese Army effective control
The Japanese Navy attacked the U.S. Navy's base at Pearl Harbor on December 7, 1941.
The Pacific War was fought from 1941 to 1945.
Continuing with previous Meiji period precedents, the Japanese Navy sent some submarines on missions on the American Pacific coast. One of them struck at ports in California, and another launched a small reconnaissance seaplane to bomb the Oregon area. Some heavy flying boats from the Marshall Islands area stuck Hawaii. An apparently diversionary invasion of the Aleutian islands in Alaska was launched, Fu-Go balloon bombs were sent to the Pacific coast. Some plans were made to attack the U.S. Pacific cities of Los Angeles and San Francisco, and to strike at the Panama Canal. The Japanese also conducted similar reconnaissance missions in Mexico, Central America and the South American Pacific coastal areas.
Japan extended its submarine long-range reconnaissance missions to the Asian and African coasts of the Indian Ocean, to Australia, New Zealand and other islands, and to the Western and South Pacific seas.
The final Japanese actions during WWII began on August 15, 1945, when Soviet forces invaded Manchukuo, Mengjiang, Karafuto, Shumushu (the last Japanese tank battle), Paramushiro and the other Chishima islands (Kuriles). Soviet paratroopers were dropped over Kwantung and began the invasion of North Korean lands. The last fierce Japanese armed resistance against Allied Forces, represented by the Red Army, was in November 1945, in the Konan (Hungnam) mountain fortress, near Genzan in the north-east area of the Korean peninsula.

References

Overseas